Regular set may refer to:

Free regular set
Closed regular set
μ-regular set
set in a theory of sets with an axiom of regularity